Ruskin High School is located in the southern part of Kansas City, Missouri, United States and is within the Hickman Mills C-1 School District. Ruskin High School's sports teams are called the Golden Eagles.

Ruskin High School had its first graduating class in 1930.

In August 2010, former Hickman Mills students merged with the Ruskin student body and became the Ruskin Academy of Engineering.

Notable alumni
 Esian Henderson, an American professional basketball player
 Edward D. “Chip” Robertson, Jr., former Chief of Missouri Supreme Court
 Robert A. Harris - AKA "Anthony Harris", Award-winning color supervisor and digital colorist

References

External links

High schools in Kansas City, Missouri
Public high schools in Missouri
1929 establishments in Missouri